Roy Fernando Guzmán Rodriguez (born June 28, 1987) is a composer of experimental, contemporary and algorithmic instrumental and electronic music, sound artist, improviser and poet born in San Juan, Puerto Rico.

His music is mainly exploratory and uses algorithmic procedures to create musical structures. The theme of chaos theory, abstracting sound scores to instrumental music, Musica A Lo Pobre, non duality, multipolarity and axiomatic music tends to be the major pivots in his work.

In sound art he investigates Plastic Sound Forms which is a field were the illusion of plasticity in sound is investigated to create solid sonic forms in 3D space.

He is also a guitarist and Puerto Rican cuatro player, improviser and founding member of the Puerto Rican folkloric experimental trio called Abolengo and the founder of CMEPR – Collective of Experimental Music of Puerto Rico.

He has performed and presented works in The Hague and Amsterdam-The Netherlands, Bratislava-Slovakia, Budapest-Hungary, Vienna-Austria, Rhode Island, Boston, New York, California – USA, Banff-Canada, Chile, Argentina and Mexico.

He is currently active in the experimental music scene in Puerto Rico.

References 

 
 
 
 

Living people
1987 births
People from San Juan, Puerto Rico
Puerto Rican composers
American male composers
Puerto Rican poets
American avant-garde musicians
Experimental composers
American noise musicians